Lost River is a 2014 American fantasy thriller film written, co-produced, and directed by Ryan Gosling, in his feature directorial debut. The film stars Christina Hendricks, Saoirse Ronan, Iain De Caestecker, Matt Smith, Ben Mendelsohn, Barbara Steele, and Eva Mendes. Principal photography began in Detroit on May 6, 2013. The film premiered in competition in the Un Certain Regard section at the 2014 Cannes Film Festival, and was released in the United States on April 10, 2015.

Plot
Single mother Billy lives in a rapidly crumbling Detroit neighborhood with her two sons, the teenage Bones and toddler Franky. Billy and Bones both dote on Franky but are fairly distant from each other. In his spare time, Bones salvages copper piping from abandoned houses in the neighborhood while trying to avoid a vicious local criminal named Bully, who wants all the copper piping for himself. One day, Bully catches Bones taking piping, which Bones abandons and flees. Later, Bones reclaims the piping from Bully's hiding place and manages to escape from Bully's sidekick, Face.

Billy meets with a banker, Dave, regarding a loan the previous bank manager talked her into so that she could stay in her house, which originally belonged to her grandmother. Since Billy is unemployed, she is unable to repay the bank and must find a way to pay for the house. After their meeting, Dave offers Billy a job, leaving out the details of what it is.

A construction crew begins tearing down the vacant houses in the neighborhood. Along with Bones, Billy, and Franky, three of the few remaining residents are Rat, her grandmother, and her pet rat, Nick. Rat's grandmother repeatedly watches her old wedding video out of grief for her husband, who died while constructing a dam. Bones discovers an old road that is overgrown and leads under a lake. While hanging out with Rat, Bones learns there is an abandoned town under the lake that was flooded when a reservoir was built. Rat says the only way to break the "curse" that is plaguing their neighborhood is to capture a "beast" from the underwater town and bring it to the surface.

Dave's job offer leads Billy to a cabaret downtown, driven there by a friendly taxi driver. She enters to see a show put on by the main performer, Cat. The appeal of the show is a realistically gory "murder" where Cat ostensibly gets stabbed multiple times and has her "blood" spray all over the delighted audience. Billy goes backstage and meets with Cat, who shows her where the real money is made: in the basement. Down there, women stand in locked plastic "shells" while men do whatever they want in their presence.

Rat invites Bones out for "a night on the town." They go dancing at an abandoned high school and imply they would leave town together if it ever came to that. Later, they go to a convenience store and run into Bully and Face, whose lips were cut off by Bully after he let Bones get away. Bones hides from Bully, and to protect Bones, Rat accepts Bully's offer to give her a ride home. Bully walks Rat to her front door and asks her if he can see Nick. He then grabs Nick and brutally kills him in front of her.

Billy has to take Franky to work with her since Bones is out with Rat. For her performance, Billy makes it look like she is cutting off her face, which excites the audience. She later sits with Dave, who hosts the place and performs a song. He takes Billy and Franky home and makes a pass at Billy, but stops when he sees Bones standing outside the car.

Bones drops Billy off at work one night and sees what she has been doing to make money to keep the house. Unable to help their financial situation anymore by stealing copper piping, Bones decides he is going to break the aforementioned "curse." He leaves Franky with Rat and goes into the river to cut the head off a dinosaur statue in an old children's park. Meanwhile, Face enters Rat's house and sets it on fire. He dies in the flames as Rat goes to rescue her grandmother, but she is unable to rouse her from her catatonia and leaves with Franky. Having succeeded in cutting off the dinosaur's head, Bones comes ashore to find his car has been set on fire. Bully tries to run Bones over with his car, but at the last moment, Bones steps out of the way and throws the dinosaur head through Bully's windshield, causing him to crash against the burning car. Bully is thrown from his car, ends up stuck head first in the lake, and drowns.

At work, Billy is sealed in a "shell" while Dave performs a sexual dance routine around her. Despite having a button that locks the shell from the inside, Dave has a remote that releases the lock. Billy finally steps out of the chamber and stabs Dave in the ear then flees. Billy returns to find her sons and Rat sitting on the steps of their house while Rat's home continues to burn. With the help of the taxi driver, the four of them leave the neighbourhood with the dinosaur head strapped to the top of the taxi.

Cast

Production
The film was originally titled How to Catch a Monster. In May 2013, scenes were shot at the Masonic Temple in Detroit, Michigan.

Music
The musical score for Lost River was composed by Johnny Jewel.

The first official tease of the film's music came on February 3, 2015, when Chromatics issued a single for their song, "Yes (Love Theme from Lost River)", which is featured in the film. Jewel released the soundtrack album on his own label, Italians Do It Better, on March 30, 2015. The soundtrack features music from the score, as well as songs from the film by Glass Candy, Chromatics, Desire, and Symmetry, as well as songs sung by Saoirse Ronan and Ben Mendelsohn, who star in the film. The song "Tell Me", sung by Ronan, was featured in the first episode of the 2017 television series Riverdale and in the eighth episode for the third season of Killing Eve. The soundtrack was released on CD, digitally, and as a limited 3xLP on purple vinyl.

Release
The film premiered on May 20, 2014, at the Cannes Film Festival, where it was met with a mixed reception from the audience. Warner Bros. Pictures, the U.S. distributor of the film, was subsequently reported to be considering selling its distribution rights to another studio. The film was released simultaneously in select theaters in the United States and through video on demand platforms on April 10, 2015.

Lost River was part of the SXSW Film Festival in March 2015 in Austin, Texas.

An airing of the film by the Asian FX network on February 13, 2017, led to Indonesia's Broadcasting Commission giving the network a five-day sanction from April 10–14 where it was prohibited for broadcasting due to unapproved sensitive content.

Critical reception
Lost River received mixed reviews at the time of its release. On Rotten Tomatoes, the film has a rating of 31%, based on 74 reviews, with an average rating of 4.60/10. The site's critics consensus reads, "Lost River suggests that debuting writer-director Ryan Gosling may have a bright future as a filmmaker, but it doesn't hold together well enough to recommend on its own merit." On Metacritic, the film has a score of 42 out of 100, based on 21 critics, indicating "mixed or average reviews".

Peter Bradshaw of The Guardian stated that the film is "colossally indulgent, shapeless, often fantastically and unthinkingly offensive and at all times insufferably conceited". Kate Muir of The Sunday Times described the film as "a lurid mash up of Lynch, Refn and Edward Hopper. In a bad way." Robbie Collin of The Telegraph called the film "dumbfoundingly poor" and stated that Gosling "confuses 'making film' with 'assembling Tumblr of David Lynch & Mario Bava gifs'".

By 2016, the film had begun to receive a more positive opinion from fans of the surreal fantasy genre.

References

External links
 
 

2014 films
2014 directorial debut films
2014 fantasy films
2014 independent films
2014 thriller films
2010s fantasy thriller films
American fantasy thriller films
Bold Films films
Films produced by Marc E. Platt
Films set in Detroit
Films shot in Detroit
Warner Bros. films
2010s English-language films
2010s American films